Bakhtiyar Khalji, the Muslim conqueror of Bengal under the Delhi Sultanate, launched a campaign to invade Tibet in the 13th century.
 
He was motivated by a desire to control the lucrative trade between Tibet and India. Tibet was a source of the most prized possession of any army---horses---and Khalji was keen to secure this route and control the trade by conquering Tibet.

Background
The Muslims conquered Bengal after overthrowing the Sena dynasty in Gaur between 1198 and 1202. Bakhtiyar Khalji, the Governor of Bengal, subsequently became obsessed with ambitions of conquering Tibet. Historically, Bengal had trade relations with Tibet along the ‘Tea-Horse Route’, through Assam, Sikkim and Bhutan, to parts of China and Southeast Asia, which were home to gold and silver mines. Tibet was also a source of horses. The planned invasion also coincided with the Era of Fragmentation and the collapse of the Tibetan Empire.

The expedition was aided by Ali Mech, a tribal chief, in the foothills of the Himalayas in the north of Bengal. He was a recent convert to Islam, and he helped the expedition by acting as a guide for them.

Campaign
On his way north, he invited the King of Kamrud (Kamrup) to join him but the latter refused. After marching for 15 days through the Teesta river in North Bengal and Sikkim, Khalji's army reached the Chumbi valley in Tibet. Surprisingly, they had faced little resistance but it soon became obvious why. The Tibetans had lured Khalji and his army into a trap. The rugged Himalayan mountain passes were an unfamiliar terrain to the invading army, who were more used to the sultry and humid plains of Bengal. The Tibetans inflicted heavy casualties on the invaders and Khalji decided to retreat. But, all along the escape route, the Tibetans continued to carry out relentless guerrilla-style attacks on the retreating army. Khalji's men were so badly defeated that the starving soldiers were forced to eat their own horses to stay alive.

On their way back to Bengal, the Army passed through the plains of Kamrup (now North Bengal), while going through the territory of Kamrup in the sub-alpine Himalayan hills, where his army crossed an ancient stone bridge on the river. The forces found the arches in the bridge to be destroyed by the Assamese which made it difficult to cross the deep river. In a desperate attempt to reach the other side of the river at Devkot, Khalji's forces lost a number of men and horses. It is said that of the 10,000-strong army that had marched into Tibet, only around 100 men returned.

Aftermath
There are two accounts of what happened to Bakhtiyar Khalji following the Tibet and Kamarupa debacle. One account speaks of him dying from ill health and injury during this retreat to Bengal. Another account notes that he was assassinated by Ali Mardan Khalji after returning to Devkot in Bengal.

See also
British expedition to Tibet

References

Wars involving Tibet
Invasions of Tibet
Conflicts in 1206
Military expeditions
Military history of Bangladesh
Expeditions from India
Medieval Bengal
Delhi Sultanate
History of Sikkim
Islam in China
13th-century Islam